Magdalena Airport  is an airport serving Magdalena, a town on the Itonomas River in the Beni Department of Bolivia.

The runway is on the western edge of the town. The Magdalena non-directional beacon (Ident: MGD) is located on the field.

See also

Transport in Bolivia
List of airports in Bolivia

References

External links 
OpenStreetMap - Magdalena
OurAirports - Magdalena
SkyVector - Magdalena
Fallingrain - Magdalena Airport

Airports in Beni Department